Alcora Exercise or simply Alcora was a secret military alliance between South Africa, Portugal, and Rhodesia, formally in force between 1970 and 1974. The code name "Alcora" being an acronym for "Aliança Contra as Rebeliões em Africa" (Portuguese expression meaning: "Alliance against the rebellions in Africa").

The official goal of Alcora Exercise was to investigate the processes and means by which a coordinated tripartite effort between the three countries could face the mutual threat to their territories in Southern Africa. The immediate goal was to face the African revolutionary movements that fought guerrillas wars against the Portuguese authorities in Angola and Mozambique, to limit the spread of the action of these movements in South West Africa and Rhodesia and to prepare the defense of the Portuguese, South African and Rhodesian territories against an expected conventional military aggression from the hostile governments of the African neighbor countries.

Alcora was the formalization of informal agreements on military cooperation between the local Portuguese, South African, and Rhodesian military commands that had been in place since the mid-1960s. Alcora was kept secret and referred to as an 'exercise' (not an alliance or treaty), mainly due to the pressure of the Portuguese Government, that feared the external and internal political issues that would be raised if it appeared to be associated with the Apartheid regime of South Africa and the minority rule in Rhodesia, in contradiction to the official Portuguese doctrine of the existence of racial equality in Angola and Mozambique.

Under Alcora, South Africa, Portugal and Rhodesia cooperated in the Angolan War of Independence, the Mozambican War of Independence, the South African Border War, and the Rhodesian Bush War.

The Alcora alliance collapsed due to the Portuguese Carnation Revolution of 25 April 1974 and the subsequent independence of Angola and Mozambique that followed.

References

South African Border War
Portuguese Colonial War
Rhodesian Bush War
Military alliances involving Portugal
Military alliances involving South Africa
Rhodesia–South Africa military relations
Portugal–South Africa relations
Portugal–Rhodesia relations
Secret treaties
1970s in Rhodesia